Augsburg Technical University of Applied Sciences ( or simply THA) is a German university located in Augsburg. It was founded in 1971, but its institutional roots as an art academy go back to 1670. With more than 6,000 students it is one of the largest institutions of its kind in Bavaria. 153 Professors as well as 352 lecturers in 7 faculties are employed there. Currently 36 undergraduate and 12 master courses are offered.

It hosts the :de:Bibliotheca Augustana website which features a catalogue of electronic texts.

Faculties

 Architecture and Civil Engineering
 Computer Science
 Design
 Business
 Electrical Engineering
 Liberal Arts and Sciences
 Mechanical and Process Engineering

History
The first institution linked to the university, the "Reichsstädtische Kunstakademie Augsburg", a college for art students, was founded in 1710. In 1833, the "Königlich Polytechnische Schule" was founded, now being a predecessor of the Engineering faculties. Other institutions, namely the "Königliche Industrie Schule" (Royal Industrial School), the Augsburg Rudolf Diesel School of Building and Engineering (Academy for Applied Technology) and the Augsburg School of Art and Design can be mentioned as roots of the university. In 1971 the university was officially founded containing a design and an engineering faculty. The other faculties and institutes followed as the university expanded to its current size.

In July 2022, the Bavarian Minister President Markus Söder awarded the then Augsburg University of Applied Sciences the title of "Technical University" in recognition of its scientific achievements in the technical field. At the start of the summer semester 2023, the university was officially renamed Augsburg Technical University of Applied Sciences.

Campuses 

The university has two main sites, centrally located in Augsburg and 500 metres apart from each other.

The Brunnenlech campus (buildings A to H), located between Brunnenlechgäßchen and Baumgartnerstraße, contains the faculty of Architecture and Civil Engineering, the faculty of Electrical Engineering, the faculty of Liberal Arts and Sciences and the faculty of Mechanical and Process Engineering. Also located at Brunnenlech campus are the administration, the library and computing center.

The Red Gate campus (buildings J to M and W), located along Friedberger Straße, contains the faculties of  Computer Science, Design and Business as well as the presidential and public relations offices.

See also
Fachhochschule

References

External links

Hochschule Augsburg website

Augsburg
Augsburg
Educational institutions established in 1971
Universities of Applied Sciences in Germany
1670 establishments in the Holy Roman Empire
1971 establishments in West Germany